Hidalgotitlán is a town in the Mexican state of Veracruz, with a population of near 18,000 in 2000. Its name derives from two words: one Spanish and the other indigenous.

The settlement stands on the Isthmus of Tehuantepec, on the left bank of the River Coatzacoalcos.  The nearest major urban centre, the city of Minatitlán, Veracruz, is 17 miles (27 km) NNW upriver.  Geographical coordinates of Hidalgotitlán are 17°46'N and 94°39'W.  The main economic activities are agriculture and livestock.

External links
 
 Municipal official information 

Populated places in Veracruz
Year of establishment missing